The 2022 Edge Open Saint-Gaudens Occitanie was a professional tennis tournament played on outdoor clay courts. It was the twenty-fifth edition of the tournament which was part of the 2022 ITF Women's World Tennis Tour. It took place in Saint-Gaudens, France between 9 and 15 May 2022.

Singles main draw entrants

Seeds

 1 Rankings are as of 25 April 2022.

Other entrants
The following players received wildcards into the singles main draw:
  Kristina Dmitruk
  Mallaurie Noël
  Alice Ramé
  Margot Yerolymos

The following players received entry from the qualifying draw:
  Julie Belgraver
  Sara Cakarevic
  Émeline Dartron
  Nagi Hanatani
  Sada Nahimana
  Ioana Loredana Roșca
  Sofia Sewing
  Lulu Sun

The following player received entry as a lucky loser:
  Julia Stamatova

Champions

Singles

  Ylena In-Albon def.  Carolina Alves, 4–6, 6–4, 6–3

Doubles

  Fernanda Contreras /  Lulu Sun def.  Valentini Grammatikopoulou /  Anastasia Tikhonova, 7–5, 6–2

References

External links
 2022 Edge Open Saint-Gaudens Occitanie at ITFtennis.com
 Official website

2022 ITF Women's World Tennis Tour
2022 in French tennis
May 2022 sports events in France